Colville River may refer to:

 Colville River (Alaska) in the state of Alaska United States
 Colville Delta, Alaska
 Colville River (Washington) in the state of Washington in the United States